CLG An Clochán Liath is a Gaelic football only GAA club based in An Clochán Liath, a Gaeltacht town in County Donegal, Ireland. The club fields both men's and ladies' teams at underage to Senior level.

However, they currently play at intermediate level.

The club were relegated to intermediate after 33 years in the 2020 Donegal Senior Football Championship.

History
An Clochán Liath have won the Donegal Senior Football Championship on seven occasions, the last coming in 1958.

The club has had two players selected to the All-Ireland SFC All Star team: All-Ireland winning full forward Tony Boyle in 1992 and Adrian Sweeney in 2003.

Noel McCole was the goalkeeper on the 1974 and 1983 Ulster Championship winning teams for Donegal, although he had transferred to St. Eunan's in 1979.  The Sweeney brothers, Adrian and Raymond, played for An Clochán Liath and Donegal. Ciaran Sharkey was a substitute goalkeeper on the 2007 NFL winning county team. Danny Rodgers played as Donegal goalkeeper in the 2014 All-Ireland Minor Football Championship final.

Notable players:
 Tony Boyle: 107 appearances for Donegal. Won All-Ireland Championship with Donegal in 1992, Ulster Championship with Donegal in 1990 and 1992, All-Star 1992
 

 Adrian Hanlon: member of All-Ireland winning panel in 2012

 John "Hughie" O'Donnell

 Adrian Sweeney: 136 appearances for Donegal. All-Star 2003
 Raymond Sweeney

References

Gaelic games clubs in County Donegal
Gaelic football clubs in County Donegal
The Rosses